The Academy of Sciences of Albania, founded in 1972, is the most important scientific institution in Albania.  In the 1980s, several research institutes began at the University of Tirana were transferred to the Academy's jurisdiction.  The institution includes the most distinguished scientists, also called "academics", that are involved in research centers and other organisations inside and outside Albania. , the Academy had 23 regular members, 10 associated members, one permanent member, and 26 honor members.

The Academy was among several dozen of the world's scientific academies which endorsed through signature the Summit Statement emerging from the New Delhi Population Summit of 1994.

Organization 
The Academy is composed of two sections:

 Social Sciences and Albanological Section
 Natural and Technical Sciences Section

It also includes the following units:

 Projects of Technological and Innovation Development,
 Branch for Foreign and Public Relations,
 Library
 Publishing

The Academy of Sciences of Albania has the country's largest academic library. Founded in 1975 starting with 10,000 volumes, it included 812,000 volumes by 1986.

In 2008, funding for most research functions of the academy was withdrawn, those research functions subsequently transferred to universities and research centers.  Four research institutes which were separated from the Academy joined to form the Centre of Albanological Studies.

Notable current and past members

Regular members 

Skënder Gjinushi
Albert Doja
Fatos Kongoli
Beqir Meta
Vasil Tole
Kosta Barjaba
Aurela Anastasi
Floresha Dado
Nazim Gruda
Anesti Kondili
Efigjeni Kongjika
Arben Merkoçi
Petraq Petro
Bashim Resuli
Xhevahir Spahiu
Jani Vangjeli
Floran Vila
Marenglen Verli
Anila Paparisto

Emeriti members 

Muzafer Korkuti
Rexhep Mejdani

Associate members 

 Arian Durrësi
 Shaban Sinani

Honorary members 

Idriz Ajeti
Ali Aliu (deceased)
Francesco Altimari
Jean Aubouin
Alain Ducellier
Bernd Jürgen Fischer
Victor Friedman
Eric P. Hamp
Mark Krasniqi (deceased)
Mateja Matevski (deceased)
Andrea Pieroni
Rexhep Qosja
Luan Starova
Răzvan Theodorescu

Notable past members 

 Eqrem Çabej
 Shaban Demiraj
 Mentor Përmeti
 Jorgo Bulo

Former notable presidents 
 Aleks Buda
 Shaban Demiraj

Periodicals
Studia Albanica, ISSN 0585-5047.
AJNTS - Albanian Journal of Natural and Technical Sciences, ISSN 2074-0867.

Notes and references

External links
https://web.archive.org/web/20100213110354/http://www.akad.edu.al/

 
Albania
Science and technology in Albania
Scientific organizations based in Albania
Language regulators
1972 establishments in Albania
Scientific organizations established in 1972
Albanian studies
Buildings and structures in Tirana
Members of the International Council for Science
Members of the International Science Council